Euobraztsovia is a genus of moths belonging to the subfamily Olethreutinae of the family Tortricidae. It contains only one species, Euobraztsovia chionodelta, which is found in Queensland, the Bismarck Islands, the D'Entrecasteaux Islands and western New Guinea.

The wingspan is 13–16 mm. The forewings are dark grey, marbled with dark fuscous. The hindwings are pale fuscous-grey.

See also
List of Tortricidae genera

References

External links
tortricidae.com

Olethreutini
Monotypic moth genera
Moths of Oceania
Moths of Asia
Tortricidae genera
Taxa named by Alexey Diakonoff